The 4th Parliament of the Province of Canada was summoned in December 1851, following the general election for the Legislative Assembly in October 1851. Sessions were held in Quebec City.  The Parliament was dissolved in June 1854.

The Speaker of the Legislative Assembly was John Sandfield Macdonald.

Canada East - 42 seats

Canada West - 42 seats

References 

Upper Canadian politics in the 1850s, Underhill (and others), University of Toronto Press (1967)

External links 
 Ontario's parliament buildings ; or, A century of legislation, 1792-1892 : a historical sketch
  Assemblée nationale du Québec (French)

04